Robert Tanielu (born 19 June 1982) is a New Zealand former professional rugby league footballer. He previously played with the Brisbane Broncos, Melbourne Storm and North Queensland Cowboys. He retired in January 2007 following medical advice after sustaining his second serious neck injury.
Rob Tanielu now lives with his 3 kids, Alize, Memphis and Knight and wife, Janelle Tanielu. He also coaches multiple teams, and do what he does best, play rugby league.

Background
Robert Tanielu was born in Christchurch, New Zealand.

Early life
Tanielu was a Sydenham Swans junior in the Canterbury Rugby League and represented the Junior Kiwis in 2001.

References

1982 births
Living people
Brisbane Broncos players
Junior Kiwis players
Melbourne Storm players
New Zealand rugby league players
New Zealand sportspeople of Samoan descent
North Queensland Cowboys players
Rugby league players from Christchurch
Rugby league props
Sydenham Swans players